Emmanuel Ntim (born 12 March 1996) is a Ghanaian professional footballer who plays as a right-back for French club Caen.

Career
In January 2019, he was loaned to Trélissac from Valenciennes until the end of the season.

On 22 June 2022, Ntim signed with Caen until 2025.

References

1996 births
Living people
Footballers from Kumasi
Association football fullbacks
Ghanaian footballers
Valenciennes FC players
FC Chambly Oise players
Trélissac FC players
Stade Malherbe Caen players
Ligue 2 players
Ghanaian expatriate footballers
Ghanaian expatriate sportspeople in France
Expatriate footballers in France